Axel Klinckowström (1867–1936) was a Swedish baron, zoologist, Arctic and Antarctic explorer, fiction writer and memoirist. Among his  works were the libretto Waldemarsskatten from 1898 and the play Olof Trätälja from 1908.

The Svalbard fjord Klinckowströmfjorden is named after him.

References

1867 births
1936 deaths
Swedish zoologists
Swedish male writers